Disagreeable Tales is an 1894 short story collection by the French writer Léon Bloy. It consists of 30 tales set in Paris, focused on criminality, perversions, and other subject matters typical of the decadent movement. The common theme is the faith in God in a time of human spiritual crisis. An English translation by Erik Butler was published in 2015 by Wakefield Press.

Stories

 Herbal Tea
 The Old Man of the House
 The Religion of Monsieur Pleur
 The Parlor of Tarantulas
 Draft for a Funeral Oration
 The Prisoners of Longjumeau
 A Lousy Idea
 Two Ghosts
 A Dentist's Terrible Punishment
 The Awakening of Alain Chartier
 The Stroker of Compassion
 Monsieur's Past
 Whatever You Want!
 Well-Done
 The End of Don Juan
 A Martyr
 Suspicion
 The Telephone of Calypso
 A Recruit
 Botched Sacrilege
 It's Gonna Blow!
 The Silver Lining
 A Well-Fed Man
 The Lucky Bean
 Digestive Aids
 The Reading Room
 Nobody's Perfect
 Let's Be Reasonable!
 Jocasta on the Streets
 Cain's Luckiest Fine

Reception
Erik Morse wrote for The Paris Review in 2015, "What distinguishes Bloy's 'tales' from those written by Villiers de L'Isle-Adam, Poe, and Lautréamont is the marked absence of any sensualist or proto-surrealist tone with its ecstatic invocations of the flesh, like those that characterize Romantic literature since William Blake. Rather, Bloy's bilious allusions to excrement ('ordure'), genitalia, rot, disease, and waste descend from a negative theology, which extols a mystical, self-mortification[.] ... For Bloy, all physical pleasures are diversion or, worst yet, satanic temptation, so it is only through intense suffering and punishment that his characters can expiate their sins."

References

External links
 Publicity page at the American publisher's website

1894 short story collections
Christian fiction
French short story collections
French-language books
Paris in fiction
Works by Léon Bloy